Miss Grand South Africa is an annual female beauty pageant in South Africa founded in 2015 by Commonwealth Pageant South Africa, led by Anel de Swardt, aiming to select the country representative to compete in its parent contest Miss Grand International. The license was transferred to Zee World in 2016, and later to Maggy-Dee Productions, led by Miss Grand South Africa 2015 "Lenie Pieterse" who currently owns and runs the contest since 2017. 

South Africa got placements at Miss Grand International twice including top 20 finalists by "Belinde Schreuder" in 2019 and the fourth runner-up by "Jeanè Van Dam" in 2021.

Background

History
South Africa made its debutant at Miss Grand International in 2015 by Magdalena Lenie Pieterse, who had been serving as the director of the Miss Grand South Africa beauty contest since 2017. After winning the 2015 title at the parallel contest of the Commonwealth Pageant South Africa, Miss & Mrs. Grand South Africa 2015–16, held in the Lyric Theatre at Gold Reef City amusement park of Johannesburg on 17 September 2015, Pieterse entered the  world final round in Bangkok, Thailand, then became the director of the national preliminary contest for such an international pageant two years later.

In 2016, An English-Bollywood TV channel in Johannesburg, Zee World, obtained one year license for the Miss Grand International 2016, the national contest was held on 6 August 2016 at Atterbury Theatre in Pretoria featuring 6 national finalists, in which Caitlin Harty, a professional model based in Johannesburg, was announced as the titleholder.  However, Zee World lost the license to Magdalena Pieterse in the following year. Under the direction of Pieterse, her first affiliated titleholder, Yajna Debideen, was appointed to the position instead of conducting the national contest. Debideen was the first runner-up Miss Supranational South Africa 2017.

In the following year, the organizer company, Maggy-Dee Productions, was founded by Pieterse, and became responsible for managing the national contest. The first pageant under the direction of such an organ took place on 4 August 2018 at Atterbury Theatre in Pretoria, and the contest has been held annually since then. South Africa got placements twice at the Miss Grand International contest, including Top 20 finalists by Belinde Schreuder in 2019 and the fourth runner-up by Jeanè Van Dam in 2021.

Since acquiring the license, the Miss Grand South Africa pageant, under the direction of Lenie Pieterse, has been aiming to empower women with the knowledge to bring about changes to communities in need by becoming a charity and cultural ambassador within South Africa. Several national finalists are currently working with the local non-profit organizations (NGOs) or providing the necessities support for those organs. For instance, the 2021 finalist, Storm Hurlbatt, an established financial advisor, who created the MakeNoise360 campaign to change the culture of violence and injustice in society. as well as Genive Trimble, the other 2021 finalist, who is affiliated with the Humanitarian Empowerment Fund, the organization that was founded to holistically change and empower communities, families, and industries through helping with food supply, security, education, and rehabilitation.

Editions

Titleholders

Gallery

References

External links

 

South Africa
Recurring events established in 2015
Grand South Africa